Ladies & Gentlemen: The Songs of George Michael is the only live album by Australian musical artist, Anthony Callea. The album serves as a tribute to the songs of George Michael; the title refers to Michael's 1998 greatest hits collection, Ladies & Gentlemen: The Best of George Michael. It was recorded and filmed live with a 9 piece band at The Palms at Crown in Melbourne on May 16, 2014.

The concert saw Callea perform with a number of artists, including a duet with Casey Donovan, whose appearance on stage to sing "I Knew You Were Waiting (For Me)" became a crowd favourite and marked the first time the pair had sung together since the Australian Idol finale in 2004.

Background and release
In 2013, Callea released the albums Thirty and This Is Christmas, performed in the hit musical Grease and sold his house. He then decided the time was right to take a risk and stage the show that would become Ladies and Gentlemen: The Songs of George Michael 30 years after the release of "Careless Whisper", Michael's first solo single away from Wham!. Originally intended to be a one-off show, the show sold out quickly and his record label, ABC Music, wanted to record and release it, to which Callea agreed.

Callea extended the life of the "one-off" show with not only a theatre performance in each capital city but also a screening of the concert DVD on Foxtel in September as part of the "Anthony Callea Presents: Music Legends" series.

Anthony said, "Like many of us, the music of George Michael has influenced me from a young age. As a singer, his vocal ability is undoubtedly one of a kind. The fact that his music catalogue is full of memorable hits that the audience absolutely embraced and loved on the night makes it even more exciting to now hit more stages around the country and celebrate one of the finest musicians of our time".

Callea lists his top five George Michael songs as; "Patience", "Amazing", "As", "Fastlove" and "Careless Whisper".

Track listing
CD
 "Amazing"
 "Father Figure"
 "Patience"
 "Fastlove"
 "I Can't Make You Love Me"
 "Jesus to a Child"
 "Kissing a Fool" (featuring John Foreman)
 "I Knew You Were Waiting (For Me)" (featuring Casey Donovan)
 "Freedom"
 "Too Funky"
 "One More Try"
 "Faith" (featuring Tim Campbell)
 "Somebody to Love" (featuring Tim Campbell)
 "As" (featuring Susie Ahern)
 "Careless Whisper"
 "Wake Me Up Before You Go Go"

DVD
 "Amazing"
 "Father Figure"
 "Patience"
 "Fastlove"
 "Jesus to a Child"
 "Kissing a Fool" (featuring John Foreman)
 "I Knew You Were Waiting (For Me)" (featuring Casey Donovan)
 "Freedom"
 "Too Funky"
 "One More Try"
 "Faith" (featuring Tim Campbell)
 "Somebody to Love" (featuring Tim Campbell)
 "As" (featuring Susie Ahern)
 "Careless Whisper"
 "I'm Your Man"
 "Wake Me Up Before You Go Go"

Personnel
Anthony Callea - vocals
Additional musicians
Annette Roach - backing vocals
Susie Ahern - backing vocals
Kim May - bass
Stuart Fraser - guitar
Colin Snape - keyboard
Paul Cecchinelli - keyboard, piano
Tim Wilson - saxophone
Carmo Perutzzi - drums

Charts
The DVD/CD debuted at No. 1 on the Australian Top 40 Music DVD Chart for the week commencing 11 August 2014.

Weekly charts

Year-end charts

Tour

References

Live video albums
2014 live albums
2014 video albums
Tribute albums
Anthony Callea albums